Distributed concurrency control is the concurrency control of a system distributed over a computer network (Bernstein et al. 1987, Weikum and Vossen 2001). 

In database systems and transaction processing (transaction management) distributed concurrency control refers primarily to the concurrency control of a distributed database. It also refers to the concurrency control in a multidatabase (and other multi-transactional object) environment (e.g., federated database, grid computing, and cloud computing environments. A major goal for distributed concurrency control is distributed serializability (or global serializability for multidatabase systems). Distributed concurrency control poses special challenges beyond centralized one, primarily due to communication and computer latency. It often requires special techniques, like distributed lock manager over fast computer networks with low latency, like switched fabric (e.g., InfiniBand). Commitment ordering (or commit ordering) is a general serializability technique that achieves distributed serializability (and global serializability in particular) effectively on a large scale, without concurrency control information distribution (e.g., local precedence relations, locks, timestamps, or tickets), and thus without performance penalties that are typical to other serializability techniques (Raz 1992).

The most common distributed concurrency control technique is strong strict two-phase locking (SS2PL, also named rigorousness), which is also a common centralized concurrency control technique. SS2PL provides both the serializability, strictness, and commitment ordering properties. Strictness, a special case of recoverability, is utilized for effective recovery from failure, and commitment ordering allows participating in a general solution for global serializability. For large-scale distribution and complex transactions, distributed locking's typical heavy performance penalty (due to delays, latency) can be saved by using the atomic commitment protocol, which is needed in a distributed database for (distributed) transactions' atomicity (e.g., two-phase commit, or a simpler one in a reliable system), together with some local commitment ordering variant (e.g., local SS2PL) instead of distributed locking, to achieve global serializability in the entire system. All the commitment ordering theoretical results are applicable whenever atomic commitment is utilized over partitioned, distributed recoverable (transactional) data, including automatic distributed deadlock resolution. Such technique can be utilized also for a large-scale parallel database, where a single large database, residing on many nodes and using a distributed lock manager, is replaced with a (homogeneous) multidatabase, comprising many relatively small databases (loosely defined; any process that supports transactions over partitioned data and participates in atomic commitment complies), fitting each into a single node, and using commitment ordering (e.g., SS2PL, strict CO) together with some appropriate atomic commitment protocol (without using a distributed lock manager).

See also
Global concurrency control

References
Philip A. Bernstein, Vassos Hadzilacos, Nathan Goodman (1987):  Concurrency Control and Recovery in Database Systems, Addison Wesley Publishing Company, 1987,  
Gerhard Weikum, Gottfried Vossen (2001):  Transactional Information Systems, Elsevier,  
Yoav Raz (1992):  "The Principle of Commitment Ordering, or Guaranteeing Serializability in a Heterogeneous Environment of Multiple Autonomous Resource Managers Using Atomic Commitment."  Proceedings of the Eighteenth International Conference on Very Large Data Bases (VLDB), pp. 292-312, Vancouver, Canada, August 1992. (also DEC-TR 841, Digital Equipment Corporation, November 1990) 

Data management
Distributed computing problems
Databases
Concurrency control
Transaction processing